Datu Odin Sinsuat, officially the Municipality of Datu Odin Sinsuat (Maguindanaon: Inged nu Datu Odin Sinsuat; Iranun: Inged a Datu Odin Sinsuat), is a  municipality and capital of the province of Maguindanao del Norte, Philippines. According to the 2020 census, it has a population of 116,768 people.

Datu Odin Sinsuat (Dinaig) was organized as a municipality through Executive Order No. 82 signed by President Manuel Roxas on August 18, 1947. In 1955, the barrio of Upi was separated from Datu Odin Sinsuat to become the town of Upi.

The town's name was formerly known as Dinaig. It was changed to Datu Odin Sinsuat in 1994, by virtue of Muslim Mindanao Autonomy Act No. 29.

The town was part of the province of Shariff Kabunsuan and served as its capital from October 2006 until its nullification by the Supreme Court in July 2008.

The municipality is home to the Awang Domestic Airport that serves the province and Cotabato City.

Geography

Barangays
Datu Odin Sinsuat is politically subdivided into 34 barangays.

 Ambolodto
 Awang
 Badak
 Bagoenged
 Baka
 Benolen
 Bitu
 Bongued
 Bugawas
 Capiton
 Dados
 Dalican Poblacion
 Datu Mustapha B. Ala
 Dinaig Proper
 Dulangan
 Kakar
 Kenebeka
 Kurintem
 Kusiong
 Labungan
 Linek
 Makir
 Margues
 Mompong
 Nekitan
 Semba
 Sibuto
 Sifaren (Sifaran)
 Tambak
 Tamontaka
 Tanuel
 Tapian
 Taviran
 Tenonggos

Climate

Demographics

Economy

Tourism 

 Mount Minandar is known for its green color due to being dominantly covered with grass. It is a two-hour hike from the foot to the summit of the mountain. It is located at the Barangay kusiong.
 Blue Lagoon is also known as Enchanted Lagoon because, according to the old people living nearby, there are enchantresses living in it. This deep lagoon situated at the Barangay Margues is the top tourist attraction of the municipality.
 Kusiong Beach is a grayish sand beach with a lot of resorts like Amaya Beach Resort, Sahara Beach Resort, and the newest Precious Cabana Resort. This is the nearest beach in Cotabato City.
 Masjid Datu Untong Balabaran of Taviran is a native pagoda-style mosque, one of the last pagoda-style mosques in the Philippines.

See also
 Mado Hot Spring National Park

References

External links
 Datu Odin Sinsuat Profile at the DTI Cities and Municipalities Competitive Index
 MMA Act No. 29: An Act Changing the name of the Municipality of Dinaig in the Province of Maguindanao to the Municipality of Datu Odin Sinsuat
 [ Philippine Standard Geographic Code]
 Philippine Census Information
 Local Governance Performance Management System

Municipalities of Maguindanao del Norte
Populated places on the Rio Grande de Mindanao
Provincial capitals of the Philippines
Establishments by Philippine executive order